Du Xiaolei (born May 25, 1990) is a Chinese baseball infielder who plays with the Jiangsu Pegasus in the China Baseball League.  

Du represented China at the 2012 Asian Baseball Championship, 2012 Asia Series, 2013 East Asian Games, 2015 Asian Baseball Championship, 2017 World Baseball Classic and 2018 Asian Games.

References

1990 births
Living people
Asian Games competitors for China
Baseball infielders
Baseball players at the 2014 Asian Games
Baseball players at the 2018 Asian Games
Chinese expatriate baseball players in the United States
Jiangsu Pegasus players
Texas AirHogs players
2017 World Baseball Classic players